The 1959 All-Pacific Coast football team consists of American football players chosen by the Associated Press (AP) and the United Press International (UPI) as the best college football players by position in the Pacific Coast region during the 1959 NCAA University Division football season.

The 1959 Washington Huskies football team won the Athletic Association of Western Universities championship and was ranked No. 8 in the final AP Poll. Three Washington players received first-team honors: quarterback Bob Schloredt; tackle Kurt Gegner; and guard Chuck Allen. Schloredt was also selected by the AP as the first-team quarterback on the 1959 All-America college football team.

USC led all other teams with four first-team selections: end Marlin McKeever; tackles Ron Mix and Dan Ficca; and guard Mike McKeever.

Selections

Quarterbacks

 Bob Schloredt, Washington (AP-1; UPI-1)
 Dave Grosz, Oregon (AP-2)
 Dick Norman, Stanford (UPI-2)

Halfbacks

 Keith Lincoln, Washington State (AP-1; UPI-1)
 Willie West, Oregon (AP-1; UPI-2)
 Dick Bass, College of the Pacific (AP-2; UPI-1)
 Jerry Traynham, USC (AP-2; UPI-2)
 George Fleming, Washington (UPI-2)

Fullbacks

 Ray Smith, UCLA (AP-1; UPI-1)
 Walt Arnold, California (AP-2)

Ends

 Chris Burford, Stanford (AP-1; UPI-1)
 Marlin McKeever, USC (AP-1; UPI-1)
 Gail Cogdill, Washington State (AP-2; UPI-2)
 Alden Kimbrough, Oregon (AP-2)
 Marv Luster, UCLA (UPI-2)

Tackles

 Ron Mix, USC (AP-1; UPI-2)
 Frank Sally, California (AP-1)
 Garry Finneran, USC (AP-2; UPI-2)
 Kurt Gegner, Washington (AP-2; UPI-1)
 Dan Ficca, USC (UPI-1)

Guards

 Chuck Allen, Washington (AP-1; UPI-1)
 Mike McKeever, USC (AP-1; UPI-1)
 Bill Berry, Washington State (AP-2; UPI-2)
 Dave Urell, Oregon (AP-2)
 Bansavage, USC (UPI-2)

Centers
 Bob Peterson, Oregon (AP-1; UPI-2)
 Baldwin, UCLA (UPI-1)
 Roy McKasson, Washington (AP-2)

Key

AP = Associated Press, selections made by AP writers on the West Coast

UPI = United Press International

See also
1959 College Football All-America Team

References

All-Pacific Coast Football Team
All-Pacific Coast football teams
All-Pac-12 Conference football teams